Gordy is a 1995 American family comedy-drama film.

Gordy or Gordie may also refer to:

People with the given name or nickname
 Gordie Byers (1930–2001), Canadian ice hockey player
 Gordy Brown, American football player
 Gordy Ceresino (born 1957),  American football player
 Gordie Clark (born 1952), Scottish ice hockey player
 Gordy Coleman (1934–1994), American baseball player
 Gordy Combs (born 1950), American football coach
 Gordie Drillon (1913–1986), Canadian ice hockey player
 Gordie Dwyer (born 1978), Canadian ice hockey player
 Gordy Foreman, Australian drummer
 Gordie Gillespie (1926–2015), American baseball, football and basketball coach
 Gordy Giovanelli (born 1925), American rower
 Gary Gordon (1960–1993), United States Army soldier posthumously awarded the Medal of Honor
 Gordie Gosse (1955–2019), Canadian politician
 Gordy Gurson (born 1992), American soccer player
 Gordie Hall (born 1935), American water polo player
 Gordie C. Hanna (1903–1993), American agronomist
 Gordy Hoffman (born 1964), American screenwriter
 Gordie Howe (1928–2016), Canadian ice hockey player
 Gordie Ion, Canadian  soccer player
 Gordie Johnson (born 1964), Canadian musician
 Gordon Johnson (musician) (born 1952), American bass guitarist
 Gordie Mitchell (born 1933), Canadian football player
 Gordie Mueller (1922–2006), American baseball player
 Gordie Pladson (born 1956), Canadian baseball player
 Gordie Roberts (born 1957), American ice hockey player
 Gordie Sampson (born 1971), Canadian singer, songwriter and producer
 Gordy Soltau (1925–2014), American football player
 Gordie Sundin (1937–2016), American baseball player
 Gordie Tapp (1922–2016), Canadian entertainer
 Gordie Windhorn (born 1933), American baseball player

People with the surname
 Gordy family, African-American family of businesspeople and music industry executives
 Anna Gordy Gaye (1922–2014), American businesswoman, composer and songwriter
 Berry Gordy (born 1929), American record producer and founder of Motown Records
 Emory Gordy Jr. (born 1944), American country musician and music producer
 Denise Gordy (born 1949), American actress
 Frank Gordy (died 1983), American restaurant owner
 Iris Gordy (born 1943), American songwriter, producer, and music executive
 John Gordy (1935–2009), pro football player and TV executive
 Josh Gordy (born 1987), American football player
 Kenneth William Gordy (born 1964), or Rockwell, American singer and songwriter
 Kerry Gordy (born 1959),American music industry executive
 Lillian Gordy Carter (1898–1983), American nurse and writer
 Matt Gordy (1909–1989), American pole vaulter
 Ray Gordy (born 1979), American  wrestler
 Sarah Gordy (born 1970s), British actress
 Terry Gordy (1961–2001), American wrestler
 Robert Gordy (born 1931), American music publishing executive and recording artist
 Stefan Leiviska Gordy (born 1975), or Redfoo, American rapper, DJ and singer
 Stephen E. Gordy (1920–2004), American politician, military officer and educator
 W. J. Gordy (1910–1993), American potter
 Walter Gordy (1909–1985), American physicist

Fictional characters with the name
 Gordy Howard, a recurring character on the TV series The Mary Tyler Moore Show
 Gordy, a character on the TV series Ned's Declassified School Survival Guide
 Gordy, the chimpanzee character from the 2022 film Nope
 Elspeth Gordie, main character of Isobelle Carmody's Obernewtyn Chronicles novel series
 Gordie, one of the Gym Leaders in Pokémon Sword and Shield

Other uses
 Gordy Records, a Motown record label
 The Gordie Foundation, a non-profit organization focussing on alcohol and hazing education

See also
 Gordon (given name)
 Geordie (disambiguation)
 Gordias, royal name in the mythic prehistory of Phrygia
 Gordis (disambiguation)